St James' Church is in the Daisy Hill district of Westhoughton, in the Metropolitan Borough of Bolton, Greater Manchester, England. It is an active Church of England parish church in the Diocese of Manchester and is part of the Deane deanery and Bolton archdeaconry. The church is recorded in the National Heritage List for England as a designated Grade II* listed building.

History

The church was built between 1879 and 1881, and was designed by the Lancaster architects Paley and Austin. Its cost of £6,500 (equivalent to £ in ) was met by two sisters, Mrs Makant and Miss Haddock. The authors of the Buildings of England series state that the church is "a masterly performance for relatively little cash". Building work began on 24 February 1879, when the first sod was turned by Miss Haddock, and the foundation stone was laid by Mrs Makant. The church was consecrated on 22 April 1881 by the Bishop of Manchester. The church provided seating for 410 people. Daisy Hill became a separate parish in 1884.

Architecture

Exterior
St James' is constructed in brick with terracotta dressings, with a small number of stone dressings. The roofs are slated. Its plan consists of a three-bay nave, a north porch, a chancel, a north transept and vestry, and a bell turret on the south side. All the windows contain Perpendicular-style tracery. The windows along the sides of the church have three lights. The porch is gabled, and has a pointed arch with carvings in the spandrels. At the west end of the church is a five-light window. The transept has a hipped roof, and a projecting entrance also under a hipped roof. There are two-light windows in the organ loft and in the vestry. The east window has six lights, and there are four-light windows in the north and south sides of the chancel. The bell turret is in five stages. The lowest stage contains an entrance with a pointed arch, and round-headed windows. In the second stage is a two-light window, and small windows illuminating the stair contained within the turret. Above this are two bell openings, with a third bell opening above them. At the top of the bell turret is a gable surmounted by a weathercock.

Interior
Inside the church the brick is bare. The nave has a tie-beam roof, and the chancel has a boarded wagon roof. In the chancel are two sedilia and an aumbry, both in terracotta. The reredos dates from 1924, and is by Shrigley and Hunt. Also in the church is a Pre-Raphaelite painting by Alfred Charles Weatherstone. In the east window is stained glass made by Morris & Co., depicting the Epiphany. In the transept is a stained glass dating from 1943 designed by Edith Norris. The only monument in the church is to the memory of its first vicar, who died in 1911. The three-manual organ was built in 1883 by W. E. Richardson at a cost of about £3,000 (equivalent to £ in ).

See also

Grade II* listed buildings in Greater Manchester
Listed buildings in Westhoughton
List of ecclesiastical works by Paley and Austin

References

Grade II* listed churches in Greater Manchester
Churches completed in 1881
19th-century Church of England church buildings
Gothic Revival church buildings in Greater Manchester
Anglican Diocese of Manchester
Paley and Austin buildings
1881 establishments in England
Westhoughton